Johnny Jones III (born October 19, 1988) is a former American football defensive tackle. He played college football at Marshall. Jones was signed by the Miami Dolphins as an undrafted free agent in 2011. He has also been a member of the Green Bay Packers and Oakland Raiders.

References

External links
 Green Bay Packers bio
 Miami Dolphins bio

1988 births
Living people
American football defensive tackles
Marshall Thundering Herd football players
Miami Dolphins players
Green Bay Packers players
Oakland Raiders players